Aetobatus poeyi is an extinct species of aetobatid eagle ray from Cuba.

Description 
The batoid Aetobatus poeyi was described by Fernández de Castro in 1873 from a locality in the lands of Ingenio (sugar mill) Constancia (today Moncada), northwest of the city of Cienfuegos, Cuba. The Eocene age for this species assigned by Fernández de Castro (1873) is questionable. According to Fernández de Castro, the fossil was collected in rocks that crop out in the lower reach of Damují River basin.

References

Bibliography

Further reading 
 

Aetobatus
Fossils of Cuba
Fossil taxa described in 1873